Auron Selaudin Miloti (born 4 August 1974) is an Albanian retired footballer who was head coach at an Austrian senior team and also at their youth Team (SV Feldkirchen) before he got chef scout at Vllaznia Shkodër(Albania). After Brdaric got fired in March 2022 Miloti got head coach for Shkodër.

Playing career

Club
The striker spent most of his career playing in Austria with SV Wörgl, where he played alongside compatriot Eldorado Merkoçi, LASK Linz, SV Feldkirchen and SC Globasnitz. He also played in Albania until 2000 with KS Vllaznia Shkodër and KF Tirana

International
He made his debut for Albania in an August 1995 friendly match against Malta coming on as a substitute for Sokol Prenga and earned a total of 2 caps, scoring no goals. His other international was a November 1995 friendly against Bosnia.

Managerial career
After retiring as a player, Miloti became youth coach at Feldkirchen and later took charge of their senior team. He trained some very interesting prospects in Feldkirchen.

Honours
Albanian Superliga: 3
 1995, 1996 , 1997

References

External links

 
 

1974 births
Living people
Footballers from Shkodër
Albanian footballers
Association football forwards
Albania international footballers
KF Vllaznia Shkodër players
KF Tirana players
LASK players
Albanian expatriate footballers
Expatriate footballers in Germany
Expatriate footballers in Austria
Albanian expatriate sportspeople in Germany
Albanian expatriate sportspeople in Austria
Albanian football managers